The Zilog Z280 is a 16-bit microprocessor, an enhancement of the Zilog Z80 architecture, introduced in July 1987. It is basically the Z800, renamed, with slight improvements such as being fabricated in CMOS.  It was a commercial failure. Zilog added a memory management unit (MMU) to expand the addressing range to 16 MB, features for multitasking and multiprocessor and coprocessor configurations, and 256 bytes of on-chip static RAM, configurable as either a cache for instructions and/or data, or as part of the ordinary address space. It has a huge number of new instructions and addressing modes giving a total of over 2000 combinations. It is capable of efficiently handling 32-bit data operations including hardware multiply, divide, and sign extension. It offers Supervisor and User operating modes, and optionally separate address spaces for instructions and data in both modes (four total possible address spaces). Its internal clock signal can be configured to run at 1, 2 or 4 times the external clock's speed (e.g. a 12MHz CPU with a 3 MHz bus). Unlike the Z80 the Z280 uses a multiplexed arrangement for its address and data busses. More successful extensions of the Z80-architecture include the Hitachi HD64180 in 1986 and Zilog eZ80 in 2001, among others. See further Zilog Z800.

The Z280 had many advanced features for its time, most of them never seen again on a Zilog processor:

 On-chip instruction and/or data cache, or on-chip RAM
 Instruction pipelining
 High performance 16-bit Z-BUS interface or 8-bit Z80-compatible bus interface
 Built-in MMU with memory protection
 Ability to determine which register set is in context with instructions JAF and JAR
 Three on-chip 16-bit counter/timers
 Four on-chip DMA channels
 On-chip full duplex UART
 User I/O trap
 Supervisor mode (privileged instructions)
 Illegal instruction trap
 Coprocessor emulation trap
 Burst mode memory access
 Multiprocessor support, with many bus configuration modes
 Support for multiple external coprocessors through an accelerated communication interface
 Multiple I/O pages, which also allows for internal I/O devices without restricting the address range of the I/O ports like on eZ80, or conflicting with existing motherboard devices, like the Z180.
 Stack overflow warning

References

Further reading
 

Zilog microprocessors
16-bit microprocessors